The 2013 Atlantic Coast Conference men's basketball tournament took place from March 14–17 at the Greensboro Coliseum in Greensboro, North Carolina.  For the second consecutive year, a team from the state of Florida captured its first-ever ACC Men's Basketball Tournament title, as the Miami Hurricanes won the championship. The 2013 tournament was the final ACC Tournament with 12 teams, as Pittsburgh, Syracuse, and Notre Dame joined the ACC for the 2013–14 season.

Broadcasting
Games were broadcast on both the networks of ESPN and over-the-air in ACC markets via Raycom Sports' ACC Network. Due to ESPN's new contract with the conference, the ACC Network no longer had exclusivity in broadcasting the tournament in ACC markets, allowing ESPN's feed to be carried.

Seeds
Teams are seeded based on the final regular season standings, with ties broken under an ACC policy.

Schedule

Bracket

Awards and honors
Tournament MVP
 Shane Larkin, Miami

All-Tournament Teams

First Team
 Shane Larkin, Miami
 Durand Scott, Miami
 Reggie Bullock, North Carolina
 P. J. Hairston, North Carolina
 Dez Wells, Maryland

Second Team
Trey McKinney Jones, Miami
Julian Gamble, Miami
Marcus Paige, North Carolina
Scott Wood, N.C. State
Olivier Hanlan, Boston College

References

2012–13 Atlantic Coast Conference men's basketball season
ACC men's basketball tournament
College sports in North Carolina
Basketball competitions in Greensboro, North Carolina
ACC men's basketball tournament
ACC men's basketball tournament